Jeffrey Herman Zwiebel (born December 12, 1965) is an American economist and the James C. Van Horne Professor of Finance at the Stanford Graduate School of Business.

A study he co-authored in 2013, along with Brett Green of the University of California, Berkeley, reported that the "hot-hand fallacy" did not appear to be a fallacy after all. Specifically, they reported that an average-power batter in Major League Baseball  on a "hot streak" was about as likely to hit a home run as a good-power batter would normally be.

References

External links
Faculty page

1965 births
Living people
Stanford University Graduate School of Business faculty
Princeton University alumni
Massachusetts Institute of Technology alumni
Sloan Research Fellows
21st-century American economists